Hapjeong-dong is a dong, neighbourhood of the Mapo-gu district in Seoul, South Korea.

See also 
Administrative divisions of South Korea

Origin of the name 
Originally, Hapjeong-dong was a part of Yeonhui-bang, a division of Seoul that encompassed approximately Seodaemun-gu and the western part of Mapo-gu. The meaning of Hapjeong-dong, written in Hanja as 蛤井洞, was "clam well". Later the Hanja transcription of Hapjeong was changed to 合井.

After the Japan–Korea Annexation Treaty of 1910, Hapjeong-dong was known as Hapjeon-ri in 1913 and Hapjeong-jeong in 1936; it was a part of Yeonhui-myeon, which extended from Seodaemun-gu to Yeouido. In 1944, it became a part of the newly created Mapo-gu district and received its current name in 1946.

Streets 
Hapjeong-dong contains the following main streets, which also give their name to surrounding, smaller streets according to the new address system in South Korea:

 Donggyo-ro separates Hapjeong-dong from Mangwon-dong;
 Dongmak-ro;
 Huiujeong-ro: the name of this street is the former name of Mangwonjeong, a pavilion built by his brother near the Han river;
 Poeun-ro: the name refers to the pen name of Jeong Mong-ju, whose statue stands at one end of the street;
 Seonji-gil;
 Tojeong-ro;
 Yanghwajin-gil: the name refers to Yanghwagin, a former port and ferry dock on the Han riverside;
 Yanghwa-ro: leads to Yanghwa Bridge, near the former site of the Yanghwajin ferry dock;
 Worldcup-ro: leads to the Seoul World Cup Stadium and separates Hapjeong-dong from Seogyo-dong.

Landmarks 
A few historical landmarks may be found in Hapjeong-dong:
 Mangwonjeong was a pavilion built in 1424 by Prince Hyoryeong, elder brother of King Sejong, to oversee farming every spring and fall. Its first name, "Huiujeong" ("a pavilion meeting a delightful rain"), was given by King Sejong after seeing the field getting wet by rain during a visit. Later, Prince Wolsan, brother of King Seongjong, inherited the pavilion and renamed it "Mangwongeong". The pavilion was damaged by a flood in 1925 and rebuilt in 1989. Nowadays it is accessible from Donggyo-ro 8an-gil and oversees the   Han river expressway.
 Yangwhajin was a port and ferry dock on the Han riverside, located near Jeoldu-san. It used to be an important entry point to Seoul.
 Jeoldu-san is a rocky promontory that oversees the Han river near the Dangsan Railway Bridge, with a shrine and park dedicated to Christian martyrs.
 Yanghwajin Foreigners' Cemetery, located near Jeoldu-san.

Other notable sites in Hapjeong-dong include:
 Yanghwa Bridge, that connects to Seonyu-do and the Han river south bank.
 the Seoul Thermal Power Station, also partly located in Dangin-dong.

A number of companies specialized in music or media are located in Hapjeong-dong, included YG Entertainment.

Transport 
The area is served by subway via Hapjeong station ( and ), 
and Sangsu station. Also, various Seoul bus lines reach the street.

References

External links
 Mapo-gu official website in English
 Map of Mapo-gu at the Mapo-gu official website
 Map of Mapo-gu  at the Mapo-gu official website
 Hapjeong-dong resident office website

Neighbourhoods of Mapo District